Gustavo Maria Bruni (6 May 1903 - 10 February 1911) was an Italian boy who is being investigated for possible sainthood by the Roman Catholic Church. He was a pious child who expressed a desire to be a priest and exhibited unusual holiness for a small child. He died of typhus at the age of seven.

Notes

1903 births
1911 deaths
Roman Catholic child Servants of God
Italian Servants of God
Italian children
Deaths from typhus